Gordon Hopkinson (born 19 June 1933) is an English former footballer who played as a defender.

Career  
Hopkinson played with Beighton Miners Welfare F.C. and in 1957 he played in the Football League Second Division with Doncaster Rovers. He made his debut for Doncaster against Fulham F.C. The following season he played with Bristol City F.C.and played a total of 73 matches for two seasons. In 1961, he played with  Cheltenham Town F.C. in the Southern Football League. In the summer of 1962, he played abroad in the Eastern Canada Professional Soccer League with Toronto Italia.

After the conclusion of the ECPSL season, he played in the National Soccer League with Toronto Ulster United. In the winter of 1962, he played in the German-American Soccer League with New York Ukrainians. He returned to Toronto Italia for the 1963 ECPSL season and assisted in securing the ECPSL Championship after defeating Montreal Cantalia. Hopkinson re-signed with Italia for the 1964 season. In the winter of 1964, he played in the Pacific Coast Soccer League with Vancouver Columbus.

After a stint in Western Canada, he returned to Toronto Italia in 1965 for his fourth season. Throughout the season he assisted Toronto in securing their second championship title against Hamilton Primos. After a four stint abroad he returned to England in late 1965 to play in the Southern League with Margate F.C. In his debut season with Margate, he appeared in 37 matches and was released after the season. He returned to his former club Toronto Italia (renamed Toronto Italia-Falcons) for the 1966 season. In his final season with Toronto, he assisted in clinching the regular-season title.

References  

Living people
1933 births
Association football defenders
English footballers
Beighton Miners Welfare F.C. players
Doncaster Rovers F.C. players
Bristol City F.C. players
Cheltenham Town F.C. players
Toronto Italia players
Toronto Ulster United players
Vancouver Columbus players
Margate F.C. players
English Football League players
Southern Football League players
Eastern Canada Professional Soccer League players
Canadian National Soccer League players
German-American Soccer League players
Footballers from Sheffield